The 1950–51 Kansas Jayhawks men's basketball team represented the University of Kansas during the 1950–51 college men's basketball season. The Jayhawks were coached by Phog Allen in his 34th year of his second tenure and 36th overall. On December 16, Allen coached against one of his former players, Adolph Rupp, for the first time. Rupp was the coach at Kentucky. The Jayhawks finished the season 8–4 in the Big Seven Conference, finishing 2nd in the conference, and 16–8 overall. They were not selected to the 1951 NCAA Tournament. One notable player on the team was Dean Smith, who would later go on to a Hall of Fame coaching career at North Carolina.

Roster
Clyde Lovellette
Ben Kenney
Bill Lienhard
Bill Hougland
Jerry Waugh
Charlie Hoag
Dale Engel
Sonny Enns
Dean Kelley
Clinton Bull
John Keller
Bill Schaake
Dean Wells
Ken Buller
Wally Beck
Harold Lowe
Jack Rodgers
Dean Smith
Aubrey Linville
Mark Rivard
Don Woodson

Schedule

References

Kansas Jayhawks men's basketball seasons
Kansas
Kansas
Kansas